The George Earle Chamberlain House is a house located in northeast Portland, Oregon, listed on the National Register of Historic Places (NRHP).  The house was built in 1893 and its original owner was Frank M. Warren. In 1904, the house was acquired by George Earle Chamberlain, who was then in his first term as Governor of Oregon, and Chamberlain owned and occupied the house until his death in 1928. Soon after buying the house, Chamberlain remodeled the first and second floors, both interior and exterior.  Since the time of Chamberlain's ownership, modifications to the building have been few. 

The house was added to the NRHP in 1991. In 2010, it was included in the National Register-listed Irvington Historic District. A home in Albany, Oregon, which Chamberlain owned, and in which he resided, from 1882 to 1892, is also on the NRHP and is also listed as the George Earle Chamberlain House.

See also
 National Register of Historic Places listings in Northeast Portland, Oregon
 George Earle Chamberlain House (Albany, Oregon)

References

External links
 

1893 establishments in Oregon
Colonial Revival architecture in Oregon
Houses completed in 1893
Houses on the National Register of Historic Places in Portland, Oregon
Irvington, Portland, Oregon
Portland Historic Landmarks
Governor of Oregon